Levopropoxyphene is an antitussive.  It is an optical isomer of dextropropoxyphene. The racemic mixture is called propoxyphene. Only the dextro-isomer (dextropropoxyphene) has an analgesic effect; the levo-isomer appears to exert only an antitussive effect.  It was formerly marketed in the U.S. by Eli Lilly under the tradename Novrad (a reversal of Darvon) as an antitussive. Unlike many antitussives, it binds poorly to the sigma-1 receptor.

Synthesis

Mannich reaction of propiophenone with formaldehyde and dimethylamine affords the corresponding aminoketone.
Reaction of the ketone with benzylmagnesium bromide gives the amino alcohol. It is of note that this intermediate fails to show analgesic activity in animal assays.
Esterification of the alcohol by means of propionic anhydride affords the propionate.

Chirality
The presence of two chiral centers in this molecule means that the compound can exist as any of four isomers. The biologic activity has been found to be associated with the α-isomer. Resolution of that isomer into its optical antipodes showed the d isomer to be the active analgesic; this is now denoted as propoxyphene. The l isomer is almost devoid of analgesic activity; the compound does, however,
show useful antitussive activity and is named levopropoxyphene.

References

Synthetic opioids
Antitussives
Propionate esters